Dr. J.M. Denison S.S. is a public high school in the York Region District School Board located on 135 Bristol Road, Newmarket, Ontario, Canada. It opened in 1989, additions were built in 1991, and a new technological studies wing was completed in late 2009. The school is just south of the border between Newmarket and East Gwillimbury, but the school address is in Newmarket.

Dr. J.M. Denison S.S. is named after John Michael Denison (1933–2001), a family physician and former coroner for York Region. Denison was a witty and ambitious doctor who was much loved and respected in and around Newmarket.  His generosity and outstanding work with teenagers inspired the community to name the school after him, an honour seldom bestowed on a living person.

Feeder schools
 Denne Public School
 Maple Leaf Public School
 Holland Landing Public School
 Park Avenue Public School
 Alexander Muir Public School
 Phoebe Gilman Public School

Extra-curricular activities

Athletics
Denison students take part in a variety of sports including volleyball, basketball, rugby, track and field, soccer, ice hockey, field hockey, and others.  Inter-school sports are governed by the York Region Athletic Association. An optional outdoor education course that teaches survival skills is no longer offered.

Music
Denison students can also participate in several musical groups that Denison has to offer, including the award-winning Paramedics of Rhythm and the Shades of Gray. Students can show off their talent in the Wind Ensemble, Denison Singers and the Denison Music Council. The Music department also plans yearly trips to show the students places outside of Newmarket and Toronto, including a yearly trip to see a musical in Stratford, Ontario. The Denison Wind Ensemble travelled to Ottawa in May 2010 to compete in the national music contest, MusicFest Canada.

Student clubs
There are a variety of student clubs for students to participate in  including the Eco-Ethical group, who work to raise awareness about environmental and social justice issues among their peers and the community. They host an annual Fairly Bazaar and Fashion4U show  and a webpage on "everyday ideas to help make the world a better place".

The math club at Denison has generated some attention in recent years, with the offer of a variety of different math contests. The science club competes in the Science Olympics annually. Programmers are encouraged to partake in the biannual programming competition "Pyweek". In 2014, a team from Denison called "101 Factorial" placed third for the entertainment value of their game "Hyperturret Defense".

Notable alumni
Kevin Pangos, NBA basketball player with Cleveland Cavaliers
Kurtis Gabriel, former NHL hockey player
Sam Bennett, NHL hockey player with Florida Panthers

See also
List of high schools in Ontario

References

External links
 Aerial photo
 Denison Secondary School 

York Region District School Board
Educational institutions established in 1989
High schools in the Regional Municipality of York
Education in Newmarket, Ontario
1989 establishments in Ontario